Habib Souaidia (Arabic: حبيب سوايدية),(born April 16, 1969 in Tebessa, Algeria) is an Algerian-French lieutenant and writer. Previously, he served as a lieutenant in the Algerian DRS.

His career 
Souaidia is known for his book "The Dirty War" (2001), in which he accuses the army of being behind massacres against civilians in the suburbs of the capital, especially Bentalha and Rais massacres. The former Algerian Minister of Defense, General Khaled Nezzar, announced on August 22, 2001, that he had filed a lawsuit against Lieutenant Habib Souaidia, who was a refugee in France.

An Algerian court sentenced him in absentia to twenty years in prison on April 29, 2002, for his participation in a project "to weaken the morale of the army and conspire to undermine the integrity of the national territory."

In January 2006, the Bouira court sentenced him to death in absentia, on charges of "kidnapping and killing" in July 1994 of three people in the Lakhdaria region, while he was in the region. Souaidia considered that the death sentence handed down to him for killing civilians is "unrealistic and evidence that the Algerian regime is a "vichy regime" that has thrown the country into a civil war."

His work 

 The Dirty War (French: La Sale Guerre), 2001.
 The dirty war trial (French: Le Procès de la sale guerre), (co-author), 2002.
 Algeria’s Hirak: The Invention of an Uprising (French: Hirak en Algérie: L'invention d'un soulèvement), (co-author), 2020.

References 

Algerian writers
Algerian writers in French
Algerian Arab nationalists
1969 births
Living people